The colony of German East Africa was founded in the 1880s, after the German explorer Carl Peters signed treaties with native chieftains on neighboring Zanzibar. On 3 March 1885, the government of the German Empire granted an imperial charter to the German East Africa Company, and a protectorate was established. German colonial rule in the region lasted until World War I, when the British occupied the colony during the East African campaign. The British territory of Tanganyika was established on 20 July 1922, when Britain acquired a mandate to administer the region as a result of Article 22 of the Covenant of the League of Nations. On 18 April 1946, the mandate was reorganized as a Trust Territory of the United Nations. Afterwards, the region remained under British administration until it gained independence on 9 December 1961 as Tanganyika.

List

(Dates in italics indicate de facto continuation of office)

For continuation after independence, see: List of heads of state of Tanzania#Governor-General

See also
Tanzania
Politics of Tanzania
President of Tanzania
List of heads of state of Tanzania
Prime Minister of Tanzania
List of prime ministers of Tanzania
List of sultans of Zanzibar
President of Zanzibar
List of heads of government of Zanzibar
Lists of office-holders

References

External links
World Statesmen – Tanzania

Tanganyika
Tanganyika
Governors of German East Africa
Governors of Tanganyika (territory)

sv:Tanganyikaterritoriet